William J. Guiry was an Irish Gaelic footballer. His championship career at senior level with the Limerick and Dublin county teams lasted two seasons from 1896 until 1897.

Guiry first played competitive football with the Commercials club in Limerick. He later joined the Kickhams club in Dublin and enjoyed championship success with both clubs.

Commercials represented Limerick in the 1896 championship, with Guiry lining out and winning a first All-Ireland medal. A year later he lined out with Dublin and won a second consecutive All-Ireland medal. Guiry  also won a set of Munster and Leinster medals.

Honours

Limerick
All-Ireland Senior Football Championship (1): 1896
Munster Senior Football Championship (1): 1896

Dublin
All-Ireland Senior Football Championship (1): 1897
Leinster Senior Football Championship (1): 1897

References

Dublin inter-county Gaelic footballers
Limerick inter-county Gaelic footballers